The Aéro-Club de France issued Aviators Certificates from 1 January 1910 on.  These were internationally recognised under the authority of the Fédération Aéronautique Internationale.

Following a suggestion by Georges Besançon, the secretary of the Ae.C.F., the first eight French aviator's licences were awarded retrospectively dated on 7 January 1909 to Louis Blériot, Leon Delagrange, Robert Esnault-Pelterie, Henry Farman, Alberto Santos-Dumont, Captain Ferdinand Ferber and Orville and Wilbur Wright.
These aviation pioneers had amply demonstrated their abilities and they were therefore not required to pass a test in order to receive a licence.  Further licences were awarded on 17 August to Hubert Latham and Louis Paulhan, on 16 September to Paul Tissandier, on 7 October 1909 to Jean Gobron, Charles de Lambert and Glenn Curtiss, and on 18 November to Maurice Farman and Henri Rougier.

The first sixteen licences were retrospectively numbered in alphabetical order, with Blériot receiving licence No. 1 and Wilbur Wright receiving No. 15 (No. 13 was not awarded, and numbers 5 and 10 were duplicated)

List
Legend

See also
Early Birds of Aviation

Notes

References

Bibliography
Eighty-Six Certified Flight PilotsFlight,28 May 1910 p. 408.

Aviation pioneers
Lists of aviators
1909 in aviation
Aviat
1909-related lists
Aéro-Club de France